= Lakkidi-Perur-II =

- village
- Country: India
- State: Kerala
- District: Palakkad

Population (2011)
  - Total: 19,459

Languages
  - Official: Malayalam, English
- Time zone: UTC+5:30 (IST)
- PIN: 6XXXXX
- Vehicle registration: KL-

Lakkidi-Perur-II is a village in Palakkad district in the state of Kerala, India.

== Demographics ==
As of 2011 India census, Lakkidi-Perur-II had a population of 19,459 with 9,286 males and 10,173 females.
